Garibaldi Lake is a turquoise-coloured alpine lake in British Columbia, Canada, located  north of Squamish and  south of Whistler. The lake lies within Garibaldi Provincial Park, which features mountains, glaciers, trails, forests, flowers, meadows, waterfalls. The park is a wildlife protected area.

Geology

It is almost entirely surrounded by mountains except at its northwestern tip, with volcanoes along the north, west, and south sides and non-volcanic peaks along the northeast and eastern shores. Lava flows from the volcanoes of Mount Price and Clinker Peak to the south blocked the ancestral valley, damming the waters of the lake behind the lava formation known as The Barrier. A series of lava outcrops along the northwestern shore of the lake form the numerous tiny Battleship Islands, several of which have been connected to the shore by simple man-made stone causeways.

The turquoise colour of the lake's water is due to glacial flour suspended in the meltwater from its two primary inflows, the large Sphinx Glacier to the east and the Sentinel Glacier to the south on the flanks of Mount Garibaldi. Throughout most of the year, outflow from Garibaldi Lake occurs only via seepage through cracks in the lava dam, with Rubble Creek appearing from springs at the base of The Barrier.

Geohazards

The unstable lava formation of The Barrier has in the past unleashed several debris flows in the area below the lake, most recently in 1855-56 forming a large boulder field which gives Rubble Creek its name. Concerns about the Barrier's instability due to volcanic, tectonic, or heavy rainfall activity prompted the provincial government to declare the area immediately below it unsafe for human habitation in 1981. This led to the evacuation of the nearby village of Garibaldi, British Columbia, and the relocation of residents to new recreational subdivisions away from the hazard zone. Collapse of the barrier has been speculated upon, and there have been suggestions of potential catastrophic downstream consequences, however, the  concludes that there has never been any suggestion in any scientific evidence that the Barrier will eventually collapse to the point of creating an uncontrolled release of Garibaldi Lake or cause extreme flooding in downstream neighbourhoods along the Squamish River. However, the  notes that a large collapse of the Barrier could potentially block the Cheakamus River increasing the possibility of a debris flood that could affect the Paradise Valley.

Recreation
All recreational activities in the area are governed by the regulations of Garibaldi Provincial Park. There are campgrounds and day-use shelters on the west shore of Garibaldi Lake, and also farther northwest at Taylor Meadows. Nearly all sites have tent platforms to protect the surrounding ecosystem. During the summer, access to the eastern end of the lake is severely limited, since no trails have been constructed along the steep and unstable slopes which plunge directly into the lake. During winter, the lake is typically frozen from late December to late April, allowing backcountry skiers and snowshoers to easily reach the far shore. A pair of small alpine huts are located in Sphinx Bay on the eastern shore and Sentinel Bay at the southeastern tip of the lake.

See also
Cascade Volcanoes
Garibaldi Lake volcanic field
Garibaldi Volcanic Belt
Garibaldi Provincial Park

References

External links

BC Parks: Garibaldi Provincial Park
LiveTrails: Garibaldi Lake
Outdoor Vancouver: Garibaldi Lake Hiking Trail
District of Squamish: Integrated Flood Hazard Management Plan
Google Earth view

Lakes of British Columbia
Sea-to-Sky Corridor
Garibaldi Lake volcanic field
Lava dammed lakes
Giuseppe Garibaldi